HaOved HaTzioni (lit. The Zionist Worker) is a settlement movement in Israel.

The movement was established in 1936 by former members of HaNoar HaTzioni, and its first settlement, kibbutz Usha, was founded on 7 November 1937. 

In 1948 the movement was one of the factions that established the Progressive Party.

See also
Politics of Israel

References

Organizations established in 1936
1936 establishments in Mandatory Palestine
Settlement movements in Israel